Newton Field  is a town-owned, public use airport located one nautical mile (2 km) west of the central business district of Jackman, a town in Somerset County, Maine, United States. It is included in the National Plan of Integrated Airport Systems for 2011–2015, which categorized it as a general aviation facility.

Facilities and aircraft 
Newton Field covers an area of 132 acres (53 ha) at an elevation of 1,178 feet (359 m) above mean sea level. It has one runway designated 13/31 with an asphalt surface measuring 2,900 by 60 feet (884 x 18 m).

For the 12-month period ending August 9, 2012, the airport had 3,500 general aviation aircraft operations, an average of 291 per month. At that time there were nine single-engine aircraft based at this airport.

References

External links 
 Aerial image as of June 1997 from USGS The National Map
 

Airports in Somerset County, Maine